R Cygni is a variable star of the Mira type in the constellation Cygnus, less than 4' from θ Cygni. This is a red giant star on the asymptotic giant branch located around 2,200 light years away. It is an S-type star ranging between spectral types S2.5,9e to S6,9e(Tc).

Stars at this mass range and evolutionary stage are pulsationally unstable, displaying a variation in their light output. R Cygni has a maximum magnitude of 6.1 and a minimum magnitude of 14.4, with a period of 426.45 days. The variation of this star was discovered by English astronomer N. R. Pogson in 1852, and it has a history of recorded brightness measurements stretching back more than a century.  R Cygni shows distinct period-doubling, where alternate maxima are of different brightness, hence the real period of pulsation could be considered to be twice that from one maximum to the next.

The Catalog of Components of Double and Multiple Stars lists 10th magnitude BD+49 3065 as a companion to R Cygni, at a separation of 91", and both stars lie at approximately the same distance.  The Washington Double Star Catalog additionally lists a 15th magnitude star as a companion at a separation of about 14".

References

S-type stars
Mira variables
Cygnus (constellation)
Durchmusterung objects
185456
031822
Cygni, R
Emission-line stars